"My Jesus" is a song by American contemporary Christian music singer Anne Wilson, released on April 16, 2021, as the lead single from her debut studio album, My Jesus (2022). Wilson co-wrote the song with Jeff Pardo and Matthew West.

"My Jesus" peaked at number one on both the US Hot Christian Songs chart and on the Bubbling Under Hot 100 chart. It was nominated for the Billboard Music Award for Top Christian Song at the 2022 Billboard Music Awards. "My Jesus" received two GMA Dove Award nominations for Song of the Year and Pop/Contemporary Recorded Song of the Year at the 2022 GMA Dove Awards, ultimately winning the Pop/Contemporary Recorded Song of the Year award.

Background
On April 16, 2021, Wilson released her multi-track single "My Jesus" as the lead single to her upcoming studio album. She shared the story behind the song, saying:

Composition

Reception

Critical response
Joshua Andre of 365 Days of Inspiring Media gave a positive review of "My Jesus", saying: "Anne expertly and skilfully tells us her testimony through a 3 minute tune, that is the Gospel in its purest form."

Accolades

Commercial performance
"My Jesus" debuted at number 13 on the US Hot Christian Songs chart dated May 1, 2021, concurrently charting at number one on the Christian Digital Song Sales chart. The song was a breakthrough hit, as it went on to reach number one on the Hot Christian Songs chart, and the Christian Airplay chart.

Music videos
On April 16, 2021, Anne Wilson released the official music video for "My Jesus". On June 4, 2021, Anne Wilson released the official lyric video for the song. On July 9, 2021, Anne Wilson released the live performance video of "My Jesus".

Track listing

Personnel
Adapted from AllMusic.

 Jacob Arnold — drums, programmer
 Chris Bevins — editing
 Jesse Brock — mixing assistant
 Court Clement — acoustic guitar, banjo, Dobro
 Courtlan Clement — electric guitar
 Nickie Conley — background vocals
 David Cook — editing
 Warren David — mixing assistant
 Jason Eskridge — background vocals, choir arrangement, vocal arrangement
 Ethan Hulse — acoustic guitar, background vocals
 Joe LaPorta — mastering engineer
 Tony Lucido — Bass
 James MacDonald — background vocals
 Scott Mills — electric guitar
 Sean Moffitt — mixing
 Jeff Pardo — background vocals, Hammond B3, piano, producer, programmer, vocal producer,
 Kiely Phillips — background vocals
 Colton Price — editing, programmer
 Danny Rader — acoustic guitar, electric guitar
 Jonathan Smith — electric guitar, organ, piano, producer, programmer
 Aaron Sterling — drums
 Matt Ulrich — organ, piano
 Colby Wedgeworth — producer, programmer
 Anne Wilson — primary artist, vocals

Charts

Weekly charts

Year-end charts

Certifications

Release history

References

External links
 

2021 singles
2021 songs
Anne Wilson songs
Songs written by Anne Wilson
Songs written by Jeff Pardo
Songs written by Matthew West
Sparrow Records singles